The Diocese of Central Tanganyika is a diocese in the Anglican Church of Tanzania: its current bishop is the Right Reverend  Dr. Dickson Chilongani.

Notes

External links 

 Official Website

Anglican Church of Tanzania dioceses